The 2019 USAC Silver Crown Champ Car Series was the 48th season of Silver Crown racing under the USAC banner. The season began with the Memphis 100 at Memphis International Raceway on March 23, and ended with the 4 Crown Nationals at Eldora Speedway on September 28. The original 12-race season for 2019 was to be an equal split of races on dirt and asphalt however as the season progressed, two dirt races were rained out and unable to be rescheduled so the final tally was six asphalt races and four dirt races. The 2019 season also featured full-season broadcast coverage on FloSports. Kody Swanson will enter the 2019 season as the defending champion.

Team and driver chart

Driver and team changes 
 DePalma Motorsports' No. 63 will not compete in 2019 after a five-year streak of owners titles with Kody Swanson.
 Nolen Racing will move to a single car operation with Kody Swanson for 2019.
 Chris Windom will move to Goodnight / Byrd Racing for the 2019 season with Scott Benic as crew chief. The team features a partnership with Matt Goodnight & Jonathan Byrd's Racing.
 Derek Bischak is slated to run all six pavement races in 2019.
 Dallas Hewitt is slated to compete in all six dirt races in 2019.
 Winged sprint car driver Chad Kemenah  is slated to compete in all six dirt races for Bob Hampshire and Clark Lamme in 2019.
 Davey Hamilton Jr. was slated to compete the entire 2019 season for Davey Hamilton Racing. Kevin Thomas Jr. & Jason Conn also joined the team for 2019. After his arrest, it is unclear whether the team will still field a ride for Davey Jr.

Schedule and results
The 2019 schedule featured twelve races, with an equal split of six races each on dirt and asphalt. Later that changed to ten races due to weather cancellations. The entire season featured live and on-demand coverage on FloRacing.

 - ≠ Race was postponed or canceled

Schedule notes and changes
 Memphis International Raceway returns to the schedule for the first time since 2004. The series attempted to return in 2014, but the race was canceled due to inclement weather. 
 Williams Grove Speedway returns to the schedule after a year hiatus.

Standings

Source:

Drivers

 Kody Swanson, 638
 Justin Grant, 578
 David Byrne, 489
 Eric Gordon, 418
 Chris Windom, 397
 Kyle Hamilton, 381
 Bobby Santos, 378
 Kevin Thomas, Jr., 366
 Mike Haggenbottom, 357
 Kyle Robbins, 355

Owners

 #6 Klatt Enterprises, 637
 #20 Nolen Racing, 613
 #91 Hemelgarn Racing, 578
 #40 Byrne Racing, 489
 #78 Armstrong-Slinkard Racing, 418

See also
 2019 USAC AMSOIL National Sprint Car Championship
 2019 USAC NOS Energy National Midget Championship

References

USAC Silver Crown Series
United States Auto Club